The Chance House and Gardens is a historic home and garden located at Centralia, Missouri. The house was built in 1904, and is a two-story, Queen Anne style frame dwelling on a raised brick basement. It features a broad verandah and porte cochere. The formal gardens were added in 1937. The house was purchased by Albert Bishop Chance in 1923. The house is now operated as the Centralia Historical Society Museum. The adjacent Garden is open to the public.

It was listed on the National Register of Historic Places in 1979.

See also
 Chatol – also known as The Chance Guest House in Centralia, Missouri

Gallery

References

External links

 Centralia Historical Society Museum

Houses on the National Register of Historic Places in Missouri
Queen Anne architecture in Missouri
Houses completed in 1904
Buildings and structures in Boone County, Missouri
Centralia, Missouri
Houses in Boone County, Missouri
Gardens in Missouri
National Register of Historic Places in Boone County, Missouri
Museums in Boone County, Missouri
Historic house museums in Missouri